Palaia is a comune (municipality) in the Province of Pisa in the Italian region Tuscany.

Palaia may also refer to:

Places
Palaia Fokaia, former community and a seaside town in East Attica, Greece
Palaia (Cilicia), a town of ancient Cilicia, Asia Minor, now in Turkey
Palaia (Laconia), a town of ancient Laconia, Greece

Persons
Joseph A. Palaia (1927–2016), American politician
Liliana Palaia Pérez (born 1951), Spanish architect and painter

Animals
Palaia pulchra a skink in the genus Palaia